A coffin is a box for interring a corpse.

Coffin or Coffyn may also refer to:


People and fictional characters
 Coffin (surname), includes a list of people and fictional characters with the surname Coffin or Coffyn
 Coffin (whaling family), a historic group of Nantucket whalers

Arts and entertainment
 The Coffin, a 2008 Thai horror film
 Coffin (film), a 2011 thriller film starring Kevin Sorbo
 Coffin (song), a song by Jessie Reyez
 "Coffin", a song by Black Veil Brides from  the EP Rebels
 "Coffin", a song by Lil Yachty

Other uses
 Coffin, a type of equestrian cross country obstacle

See also 
 Coffyn, a pastry casing made of Huff paste
Casket (disambiguation)
Coffin Bay (disambiguation)